Katydiseius is a genus of mites in the family Otopheidomenidae.

References

Mesostigmata
Articles created by Qbugbot